Mario Molina (born 16 December 1944) is a Chilean boxer. He competed in the men's featherweight event at the 1964 Summer Olympics. At the 1964 Summer Olympics, he lost to Seok Jong-gu of South Korea.

References

External links
 

1944 births
Living people
Chilean male boxers
Olympic boxers of Chile
Boxers at the 1964 Summer Olympics
Sportspeople from Santiago
Featherweight boxers
20th-century Chilean people
21st-century Chilean people